The Green Line is a light rail system run by the Massachusetts Bay Transportation Authority (MBTA) in the Boston, Massachusetts, metropolitan area. It is the oldest MBTA subway line, and with tunnel sections dating from 1897, the oldest subway in North America. It runs underground through downtown Boston, and on the surface into inner suburbs via six branches on radial boulevards and grade-separated alignments. With an average daily weekday ridership of 137,700 in 2019, it is the third most heavily used light rail system in the country. The line was assigned the green color in 1967 during a systemwide rebranding because several branches pass through sections of the Emerald Necklace of Boston.

The four branches are the remnants of a large streetcar system, which began in 1856 with the Cambridge Horse Railroad and was consolidated into the Boston Elevated Railway several decades later. The branches all travel downtown through the Tremont Street subway, the oldest subway tunnel in North America. The Tremont Street subway opened its first section on September 1, 1897, to take streetcars off overcrowded downtown streets; it was extended five times  over the next five decades. The streetcar system peaked in size around 1930 and was gradually replaced with trackless trolleys and buses, with cuts as late as 1985. The new D branch opened on a converted commuter rail line in 1959. The Green Line Extension project extended two branches into Somerville and Medford in 2022.

Route description

The Green Line's core is the central subway, a group of tunnels which run through downtown Boston. A branch of the Tremont Street subway, disused since 1962, runs south from Boylston to the former Pleasant Street incline.

The Green Line has four western surface branches, each with a letter designation:
It runs  on Commonwealth Avenue through Boston University, Allston, and Brighton to Boston College station. 
It runs  on Beacon Street through Brookline to Cleveland Circle station. 
The D branch diverges from the C branch tunnel southwest of Kenmore, surfacing at Fenway station. It runs  though Brookline and Newton along the grade-separated Highland branch (a former Boston and Albany Railroad commuter rail line) to Riverside station. 
The E branch runs southwest through the Huntington Avenue subway from Copley, surfacing in the median of Huntington Avenue at Northeastern University station.

B and C branch service terminates at Government Center, while D and E branch service continues north from downtown Boston. The elevated Lechmere station is located on the Green Line Extension viaduct, which continues north to a flying junction with two branches:
It is operated as part of the D branch.
It is operated as part of the E branch.

Former branches

The Green Line A branch was the northernmost of the branches, running from the Blandford Street portal (still used by the B branch), west to Watertown, mostly street-running. The  bus replaced the streetcar line in 1969. The A branch diverged from Commonwealth Avenue west of Boston University and ran to a terminus in Watertown, across the Charles River from Watertown Square, until 1969. Although the route-letter scheme had been introduced two years prior to its closure, the "A" designation was never signed on streetcars to Watertown. It was, however, included in the destination signs on the Boeing-Vertol LRVs ordered in the mid-1970s, when reopening service to Watertown was under consideration. The "A" line tracks remained in non-revenue service to access maintenance facilities at Watertown until 1994.

The Pleasant Street portal hosted two services in its final days.

The last two routes to continue beyond the Canal Street portal both ran to Sullivan. The  ran via Main Street, last running in 1948, and the  via Bunker Hill Street last ran in 1949. Until 1997 trains continued to use the portal and its North Station surface station as a terminal.

These were truncated in 1932 into a shorter route from Brookline Village to the subway via the Boylston Street portal, which itself stopped running in 1938 (being cut back to Brigham Circle short-turn trips), three years before the closure of that portal.

The last "foreign" cars to operate in the subway were those of the Eastern Massachusetts Street Railway, running from the Canal Street portal to the Brattle Loop at Scollay Square until 1935. It was then that the old Mystic River Bridge to Chelsea was closed to streetcars and the lines were replaced by bus service; the next year the BERy bought the Eastern Mass Chelsea Division and through-routed it with its lines connecting to the East Boston Tunnel at Maverick.

Rolling stock 
Like the three other MBTA subway lines, the line uses standard gauge tracks. However, instead of heavy rail metro rolling stock, the Green Line uses modern streetcars (light rail vehicles) as heavy rail stock would be inappropriate for the surface branches with their numerous grade crossings.

Listing

Active fleet
Rolling stock :

Retired fleet 
Only MBTA operated vehicles are included here, not cars from the Boston Elevated Railway (BERy) era.

History

Early rolling stock

When it opened at the end of the 19th century, the Tremont Street subway was not intended as a full-scale rapid transit line (though it was built to pre-metro standards), but to allow ordinary streetcars to bypass the worst street congestion in downtown Boston. Operations by several different companies were eventually consolidated into the Boston Elevated Railway, which ran a mixture of car types. After receiving a test unit in 1937, the BERy began to standardize on PCC streetcars, acquiring 320 units between 1941 and 1951 plus an additional 25 in 1959 to phase out the last older cars.

Two older streetcars are on display on the unused outer inbound track at Boylston station, which formerly carried cars coming from the Pleasant Street portal. Car #5734, a Type 5 A-1 car built in 1924 and retired in 1959, is owned by the Seashore Trolley Museum, but resides semipermanently in Boston. PCC #3295, built in 1951 and retired in 1986, is owned by the MBTA. The cars were formerly used for fantrips, the most recent one being in 1998.

Boeing LRV

In the early 1970s, light rail—which had largely disappeared from North America after the slow decline of streetcar systems from the 1920s to the 1950s—was reintroduced as a method of urban renewal less expensive than conventional metro systems. In 1971, as part of a program to supply further work to defense contractors as the Vietnam War wound down, the Urban Mass Transit Administration selected Boeing Vertol as systems manager for a project to design a new generic light rail vehicle. The UMTA hoped that this "US Standard Light Rail Vehicle" would jumpstart the development of transit lines just as the standardized PCC streetcars had done decades prior.

Boston (with its older streetcar tunnel systems) and San Francisco (with a new Muni Metro streetcar tunnel being built as part of BART construction) were chosen as the testbeds for this new rolling stock. The vehicle was designed as the largest rolling stock that would fit through the Tremont Street tunnel, the Muni Metro's Twin Peaks Tunnel, and SEPTA's subway–surface lines tunnel. The new cars were faster—a top speed of  versus the PCC's —and had an articulated middle section for higher capacity.

Boeing began construction of 175 cars for the MBTA in May 1973. The first LRVs entered service on the D branch in December 1976 but were immediately beset with problems. Certain cars frequently derailed on tight turns in the Riverside, Boston College and Lechmere yards. Battery trays, air conditioners—mounted under the cars, continually drawing in dirt and debris from under the car when in the tunnels—and air compressors all suffered numerous failures; the plug-style doors had trouble sealing properly; and traction motors failed sooner than expected.

Desperate for reliable rolling stock, in 1977 MBTA launched an overhaul program to extend the availability of its older PCC cars. A total of 34 cars, primarily out-of-service wrecks and parts cars, were rebuilt to as-new condition. , some of these rebuilt PCC cars still run on the Ashmont–Mattapan High Speed Line.

After years of fighting between the MBTA and Boeing-Vertol, both sides reached a settlement in 1979. MBTA was allowed to reject the final 40 SLRVs, and Boeing would return $40 million to MBTA for the cost of repairs and modifications to several cars.

Modern fleet

In the early 1980s, with a final settlement with Boeing in place, MBTA started looking for new equipment to supplement and replace the problematic LRVs.

In 1980, the MBTA tested Canadian Light Rail Vehicles for three months to determine whether they could be used on the Green Line. The MBTA ultimately found them unsuitable.

Ultimately, the MBTA purchased LRVs from the Japanese firm Kinki Sharyo. These Type 7 were designed with the best features of the US SLRV, the Canadian LRV, and the PCC cars. A total of 120 Type 7 vehicles were purchased, 100 were delivered between 1986 and 1988, and an additional 20 cars ordered and delivered in 1997.

Low-floor LRVs were added starting in 1998, allowing for accessible boarding directly from slightly raised platforms. MBTA ordered 100 of these Type 8 cars from Italian company AnsaldoBreda. The first Type 8s entered revenue service in March 1999, and quickly proved problematic and difficult to maintain: the first cars failed every , far short of the  specified by the MBTA, and were prone to derailment at higher speeds as well as brake problems, echoing the problems with the Boeing stock. In December 2004, the MBTA canceled orders for the cars still to be delivered as part of the authority's nine-year, US$225 million deal with Breda. One year later, in December 2005 the MBTA announced that it had entered into a restructuring of the deal, reducing the order to 85 cars (with spare parts to be provided in lieu of the 15 remaining cars), and providing for the remaining payment under the original deal only if the cars met performance requirements. Construction of the last car under the order was completed on December 14, 2006. Ultimately, 10 additional cars would be assembled and delivered in late 2007, with five spare shells retained (95 cars in service). The MBTA was criticized for their failure to assess Bredas' reliability before entering into the deal, and during delivery. The agency was also forced to spend an additional  to modify tracks to prevent derailments and the Type 8 fleet was unable to be used on the D branch (where cars reach full speed) after those modifications were complete in 2008.

As the final Type 8s were delivered, the last of the Boeing-Vertol cars were retired in March 2007 and all except ten of the cars were scrapped. Of the remaining cars, six were sold to the US Government and are now in Pueblo, Colorado for testing purposes, one was given to the Seashore Trolley Museum, and three were retained by the MBTA for work service.

In 2006, as part of a legal settlement, the MBTA committed to always operate at least one low-floor car in each train, with no trains consisting only of Type 7 cars.

Of the 120 Type 7 cars, 103 were overhauled by Alstom in Hornell, New York. The work includes new propulsion systems, climate control systems and interiors as well as exterior work. The pilot car for the program left in October 2012 and was returned in November 2014, with the last car overhauled in April 2019.

Twenty-four new Type 9 Green Line cars were delivered between 2017 and 2020. Revenue service began in late 2018 and all 24 cars were planned to enter service by the fall of 2019, although actual acceptance continued through 2021. The Type 9 cars will provide additional rolling stock to allow for Green Line Extension operations, and will not replace any of the existing fleet. The cars were made by CAF USA, Inc., with the shells and frames made in Spain, and final assembly and testing done at their plant in Elmira, New York. , the first unit had been expected to enter passenger service in Spring 2018, with all 24 cars in service by the end of the year. The first Type 9 car, #3900, began revenue service on December 21, 2018.

Future fleet 

Planning for a Type 10 fleet—which would replace all Type 7 and Type 8 cars in the mid-2020s—began in 2018 with plans for a fully low floor fleet. The MBTA released a request for proposals in December 2019, with notice to proceed expected to be given in 2021. In June 2021, the MBTA indicated that the initial order would be for 102 LRVs operating as single-car trains, with two-car trains deferred for a later project with federal funding. Manufacturer bids were due in July 2021.

The MBTA awarded a $811 million contract to CAF USA on August 31, 2022, to manufacture 102 seven-segment Type 10 "Supercar" LRVs. Four pilot vehicles are to be delivered in spring 2026, with deliveries of two LRVs per month from spring 2027 to spring 2031. The contract included options for additional LRVs. As a separately-funded project, Lake Street Yard will be fully reconstructed to support Type 10 vehicles, with Riverside Yard and the GLX Vehicle Maintenance Facility also modified. When the Type 10 cars are delivered, the Type 9 fleet is expected to be transferred over to the Ashmont–Mattapan High-Speed Line, replacing the PCC streetcars.

Accessibility

The Red Line, Blue Line, and Orange Line run rapid transit cars and use stations with high platforms level with the car floor providing easy access for the disabled. The Green Line originated as a streetcar line, and used a variety of streetcars before converting to light rail vehicles.

Originally all the Green Line stations had platforms at track level, and passengers had to ascend several steps up into the vehicles. This limited accessibility for persons with disabilities. To address this issue and comply with changing federal and state laws, additional facilities have been added:

 Wheelchair lifts have been provided at some stops. They are rolled up to the car door and the lift mechanism is operated using a hand crank. They are quite time-consuming to operate, causing significant delays when used during peak periods.
 Short platforms level with car floors, accessed by ramps, were installed just before or after selected stations. Because the car door arrangement required a large gap between the platform and the car, a bridge plate attached to the raised platform had to be positioned after the train stopped with a door at that platform.
 The MBTA has followed the worldwide trend of operating low-floor streetcars. Platforms are being raised slightly to about the height of a street curb. Low-floor cars have remotely controlled bridge plates at the center doors to allow wheelchairs and strollers to reach the car floor a few inches higher. , the D branch will be the first branch to be completely retrofitted with raised platforms as part of this program.

History

Beginning in the 1850s, Boston sprouted a large network of horsecar lines, the first public transit in the city. The West End Street Railway was created by the state legislature in 1887 to build a single line, but soon consolidated many of the existing lines into a single privately owned system with consistent fares and route designations. The Allston – Park Square line (which served the general area of the A branch) was the first section to be converted to electric traction in 1889. It used modified existing horsecars outfitted with Frank J. Sprague's revolutionary electrical equipment, which had first been demonstrated the previous year in Richmond, Virginia. In 1897, the West End Street Railway property was handed over to the Boston Elevated Railway (BERy) in the form of a 24-year lease, and the companies were ultimately combined.

By the early 1890s, the sheer quantity of streetcars during peak periods was clogging the streets of downtown Boston. The Tremont Street subway, the first passenger subway in North America, was opened in stages in 1897 and 1898, with underground stations at Boylston, Park Street, Scollay Square, Adams Square, and Haymarket. The Main Line Elevated was run through the tunnel from 1901, displacing through-running streetcars, until it was rerouted to its own Washington Street Tunnel in 1908, and the streetcars were returned to the Tremont tunnel.

Though initially intended merely to clear streetcars from the busiest sections of downtown streets, the Tremont Street subway became useful as a rapid transit service in its own right. The 1912 completion of the Causeway Street Elevated and Lechmere Viaduct extended grade-separated service to Lechmere Square in Cambridge, and in 1922 the Lechmere transfer station was built.  In 1914, the Boylston Street subway opened as a westward extension to just short of Kenmore Square, and in 1933 Kenmore station and short tunnel extensions towards two surface lines were added. In 1941, the Huntington Avenue subway and its two additional underground stations removed the last surface streetcars from downtown Boston.

Beginning in the 1930s, the massive surface streetcar system was "bustituted" with buses and trackless trolleys which had lower operating costs and more flexible routes. As the 1950s closed out, the only remaining streetcar lines were the Watertown Line, Commonwealth Avenue Line, Beacon Street Line, Arborway Line, and the Lenox Street Line plus several short turn services. In 1959, the Boston and Albany Railroad's Highland Branch was converted to the Riverside Line, a fully grade-separated suburban service.  In 1961, the last through service to Lenox Street via the Pleasant Street portal ended, though a Pleasant Street – Boylston shuttle continued for one more year. In 1963, part of the original subway was rebuilt under Government Center, abandoning and partially demolishing Adams Square station.

In 1947, the now-bankrupt BERy was replaced by the public Metropolitan Transit Authority (M.T.A.). The new agency was unpopular, even spawning a popular protest song; in 1964, it was replaced with the Massachusetts Bay Transportation Authority which had an expanded funding area to preserve suburban commuter rail lines. In 1967, as part of a systemwide rebranding that included new station names and color names for the transit lines, the remaining streetcar services were designated the "Green Line" because several of them traveled near the Emerald Necklace park system. The streetcar lines were given letter designations: "A" to the Watertown Line, "B" to the Commonwealth Avenue Line, "C" to the Beacon Street Line, "D" to the Riverside Line, and "E" to the Arborway Line.

The Watertown Line ran mostly in mixed traffic after diverging from Commonwealth Avenue; it was permanently replaced with buses in 1969. The section of the Arborway Line past Heath Street was "temporarily" – ultimately permanently – bustituted in 1985. In 2001, with new low-floor streetcars entering service, the MBTA began retrofitting underground stations and major surface stops with low raised platforms for accessibility for all. In 2004, the Causeway Street Elevated was replaced with a new tunnel under the Boston Garden, which consolidated the Orange Line and Green Line at a new North Station "superstation", while continuing to connect to Commuter Rail service north of Boston.

The name "Green Line" was assigned in 1967 as part of a major reorganization of the MBTA system's branding. In the 1970s, the Green Line and all other MBTA lines were re-evaluated by the Boston Transportation Planning Review for region-wide efficacy and future modernization alternatives initiated as far as physical plant and operating measures.

Operations and signaling

, each of the four branches operate on 7 or 7.5-minute headways during weekday peak hours, and 7.5 to 12 minute headways at other times. Vehicle usage ranges from 44 trains (88 cars) to 60 trains (120 cars).

Unlike the MBTA heavy rail subway lines, the Green Line has only limited central control and monitoring. This also means that it has lagged behind the other three rail lines in the availability of countdown signs and "next train" arrival information. The line is signalled with advisory wayside signals, except on surface portions in street medians or in-street running. Wayside signal territory stretches from Lechmere to the surface portals at Kenmore, and along the entire length of the D–Riverside branch. There are no automatic protection devices, but the cars have track brakes, giving the ability to stop quickly under control of the operator. Interlockings are controlled through a wayside Automatic Vehicle Identification (AVI) system that relies on the operator properly entering the destination manually on a roto-wheel in the train cab at the beginning of a run.

The line is monitored from the Operations Control Center (OCC). Responsibility for controlling service is shared by the control room and field personnel along the right of way. Track circuit and signal indications are not transmitted to the operational personnel sites. In lieu of track circuit indications, the AVI system is displayed in the control room to provide a periodic update to train position wherever AVI detectors exist. The AVI system user interface was solely text based until the current control room was opened, in which a new schematic display based on AVI data was instituted. Track circuit indications are available digitally in signal houses at the Park Street interlocking, at the new North Station interlocking, and at the new Kenmore interlocking, but are not transmitted to OCC. In January 2013, the MBTA announced plans to add full vehicle location tracking on the Green Line for countdown signs and smartphone applications, including using AVI data in the tunnels and GPS receivers on the surface lines. The first real-time data—location data on the surface lines—became available in October 2014. Full tracking was expected by early 2015.

The MBTA typically runs two-car trains at all times. The last scheduled use of one-car trains on weekdays was in March 2007. Three-car trains were added on the B and D branches in 2010 – their first use since 2005 – and a four-car train was tested in April 2011. In March 2011, the number of three-car trains was substantially increased, including use on the E branch. However, three-car trains suffered from reliability problems and slow boarding. The use of three-car trains ended in March 2016.

The MBTA approved a $82.6 million contract in May 2019 for a train protection system for the Green Line. The system will enforce red signals and automatically stop a train if it approaches another train too closely. The project was 28% complete by December 2021; installation of in-vehicle electronics was scheduled to be complete by September 2023, with wayside installation complete in June 2024 and full operation that December. A reallocation of funds in January 2022 shortened the project timeline, with completion expected in 2023. However, in January 2023, an NTSB report found that the project had been delayed to June 2025.

Turnarounds

Aside from the terminal stations, several locations have turnaround loops or crossover switches where trains can reverse direction for short turns. Two of these, where northbound trains can turn southbound, are regularly used as the downtown terminals for the branches:

 At , a pair of pocket tracks allow reversing. , no trains use this turnaround except in a delay.
 At , a loop under City Hall Plaza. , this is the terminal of the B and C branches.

Several other loops and crossovers are not used in regular revenue service, but may be used during construction work or service disruptions, or for non-revenue trains:
 At Government Center, the Brattle Loop allows southbound trains to turn northbound.
 At , a loop connects the inner tracks. The MBTA plans to add a crossover to allow through movements from the terminating (inner) northbound platform at Park Street are expected to increase capacity and reliability.
 At , a loop allows eastbound (inbound) C and D branch trains to turn westbound.
 On the B branch, a pocket track at  allows trains to reverse in either direction. It is sometimes used to reverse westbound trains to provide extra service in the subway.
At Reservoir, the spur tracks to Reservoir Carhouse have platforms for short turn trains.
The Brigham Circle crossover is frequently used for short turns during traffic congestion on the street-running section of the line.

Location tracking

The Red, Orange, and Blue lines have block signalling systems that make tracking the location of trains easier. Signs in most station on those lines began to display real-time train information in late 2012 and early 2013, while data feeds have been available for smartphone applications since 2010. However, the wayside signalling system used in the Green Line's tunnels and the D branch does not provide for that level of tracking, nor do the basic stop/go signals used on the street-level branch lines. In January 2013, the MBTA announced plans to provide full tracking data for the Green Line by 2015, allowing use of smartphone applications and in-station countdown signs. The $13.4 million system is funded by MassDOT; it uses existing Automatic Vehicle Identification (AVI) systems plus additional sensors in the tunnels, and GPS receivers on the surface sections.

In September 2013, the MBTA announced that "Next Train" signs would be unveiled at Kenmore that month. On October 23, 2014, location tracking data became available for Green Line trains above ground. Arrival predictions for surface stations – including the activation of countdown signs along the D branch – and underground tracking and predictions were to be rolled out in two phases by early 2015. In March 2015, the MBTA announced that enough AVI equipment had been installed to allow the release of some underground data by April. Most underground data was live by August, but trains near Park Street and Boylston waited until September.

The first predictive countdown signs on the Green Line were activated at Newton Centre and Newton Highlands on April 24, 2015, followed shortly by other D branch stations. Countdown signs at Kenmore and Hynes were activated in August 2015. Signs at Copley and Arlington plus eastbound-only signs from Boylston through Science Park were activated in October 2015. The final set of signs – those on the westbound platforms of Science Park through Boylston – were activated in January 2016. Because holding and short-turning trains at the downtown terminals makes time-based predictions unreliable, the signs instead show how many stops away a train is.

Projects

Somerville/Medford extension

The Green Line Extension (GLX) project added two new branches into the northern suburbs of Somerville and Medford. The project opened in two phases in 2022 at a total cost of $2.28 billion. The rebuilt Lechmere station and the Union Square Branch to  opened on March 21, 2022, as an extension of the D branch (briefly the E branch). The total project cost is estimated to be $2.28 billion: $0.996 billion from the federal government and $1.28 billion from the state. Daily ridership on the extension is projected to be 45,000 by 2030.

The GLX begins at the north end of the Lechmere Viaduct, with a new elevated line continuing north for about  parallel to the O'Brien Highway. The former surface-level Lechmere station will be replaced by an elevated station on the new alignment. The two branches split with an aerial flying junction on the Red Bridge viaduct in the Inner Belt area. Like the existing D branch, the new branches are fully grade-separated, with no level crossings. A new vehicle storage yard and maintenance facility is located in the Inner Belt area, with leads from both branches at Red Bridge. An extension of the Somerville Community Path runs along the Medford Branch south of Lowell Street, with a high bridge carrying it above the Red Bridge viaduct.

An extension north from Lechmere was first proposed in the 1920s, and again several times during the 20th century. To settle a lawsuit with the Conservation Law Foundation to mitigate increased automobile emissions from the Big Dig, the Commonwealth of Massachusetts agreed in 1990 to extend the Green Line from Lechmere to Medford Hillside through Somerville and Medford, two suburbs underserved by the MBTA relative to their population densities, commercial importance, and proximity to Boston. After delays in planning, the state agreed in 2006 to complete the project by 2014.

The planned completion was delayed to 2018 in 2011, and to 2020 in 2014. A groundbreaking ceremony was held in December 2012. The project was expected to cost about $2.2 billion, with half of that paid by the Federal Transit Administration (FTA). However, in 2015 it became clear that the project would cost $3 billion, putting its future in doubt. The project was value engineered to reduce its cost: station designs were simplified, several bridge reconstructions eliminated, the Community Path extension shortened, and the maintenance facility reduced in size. The FTA approved the modified $2.3 billion plan on April 4, 2017. The contact was rebid with a provision for the optional restoration of six of the elements deleted in the 2016 plan. The winning bid, selected in November 2017, included six optional elements, including canopies and additional elevators at stations, public art, a full-size vehicle maintenance facility, and the full extension of the Community Path to East Cambridge. Construction reached 20% completion in November 2019; it was over 50% completed by October 2020, and 80% by June 2021.

Accessibility renovations

The majority of the Green Line opened by 1959, long before the 1990 Americans with Disabilities Act mandated that new construction be fully accessible. The MBTA began modifying Red, Orange, and Blue Line stations for accessibility in the late 1980s; however, Green Line stations were not modified until the late 1990s, when the Type 8 vehicles were under construction. The MBTA began the Light Rail Accessibility Program in 1996. Because modifying the numerous stations all at once would be prohibitively expensive, the MBTA designated "key stations" – largely those with high ridership or bus connections – for prioritization.

Between 2001 and 2003, 16 surface stations (4 on the B branch, 4 on the C branch, 3 on the D branch, and 5 on the E branch) were retrofitted with raised platforms. The 13 B, C, and E branch stations collectively cost $32 million. Construction of raised platforms was completed at Park Street and Haymarket around 2003; Prudential was also reconstructed that year by the developer of 111 Huntington Avenue. The fully accessible underground "superstation" at North Station opened in 2004. Wooden mini-high platforms, allowing level boarding on older Type 7 LRVs, were installed at eight Green Line stations in 2006–07 as part of the settlement of Joanne Daniels-Finegold, et al. v. MBTA.

A two-year closure of  ended in 2016 with the opening of the accessible transfer station. As part of the Green Line Extension, Lechmere was replaced by a fully accessible elevated station in 2022.

Other projects have moved towards full accessibility of the surface branches.  was made accessible in 2006. Construction of two accessible stations ( and ) on the B branch to replace four non-accessible stations took place in 2021. Temporary work to make  accessible was done in 2019; a full reconstruction will begin in 2022. Renovations for the four remaining non-accessible D branch stations are planned to begin in mid-2023. Construction of additional accessibility modifications on the B and C branches is expected to take place in 2023–24. In 2021, the MBTA indicated plans to modify the Heath Street–Brigham Circle section of the E branch with accessible platforms to replace the existing non-accessible stopping locations.

Station listing
All stations in the central subway have prepaid fare areas (fare control).

Incidents and accidents

On May 28, 2008, two D branch trains collided in Newton. The operator of one of the trains was killed and numerous riders were taken to area hospitals with injuries of varying degrees of seriousness. While it was originally thought that cell phone use was responsible for the accident, the cause was officially determined to be an episode of micro-sleep caused by the driver's sleep apnea.

On May 8, 2009, two trolleys rear-end collided underground between Park Street and Government Center when the driver of one of the trolleys, 24-year-old Aiden Quinn, was text messaging his girlfriend while driving. Quinn had run through a red light before the crash, which injured 46 people. MBTA officials estimated that the cost of the crash was $9.6 million. A strict ban on cell phone usage by MBTA operators was later enacted.

On October 8, 2012, two E branch trolleys collided in the 700 block of Huntington Avenue near Brigham Circle when one derailed into the other, injuring three people including a train operator.  The next month on November 29, two trolleys collided at low speed at Boylston, injuring several dozen passengers.

On March 10, 2014, a D branch trolley with passengers aboard derailed in the tunnel just west of Kenmore Station, near the flat junction between the "D" and "C" branches.  A second train had to brake suddenly to avoid hitting the derailed train. Ten people were treated for moderate injuries.

In October 2016, The Boston Globe reported that the Green Line had the highest number of derailments and accidents on light rail lines in the United States in 2015. The number of incidents had been increasing for several years due to deferred maintenance on tracks and wheels, which resulted in more low-speed derailments of Type 8 cars.

As part of its crash investigations, the National Transportation Safety Board recommended in 2009 that the Green Line be outfitted with positive train control to prevent collisions. The MBTA decided in 2012 not to implement PTC, estimating the cost at $645 million to $721 million. In 2015, as crashes continued to happen, the NTSB complained the agency was moving too slowly identifying a feasible alternative. In 2019, the MBTA awarded a contract to implement a similar safety system by 2024, at a cost of $170 million. A train would automatically brake if a driver violates a traffic signal, or if cameras or radar detect an obstacle.

References

External links

MBTA – Green Line
MBTA – Green Line Extension

 
Standard gauge railways in the United States
Railway lines opened in 1897
1897 establishments in Massachusetts
600 V DC railway electrification